Gabriele Tinti (22 August 1932 – 12 November 1991) was an Italian actor who was married to actress and model Laura Gemser.

Biography
Tinti was born in Molinella, Emilia-Romagna. He started his career in the 1948 movie Difficult Years, and eventually got his first major starring role in the 1954 movie Chronicle of Poor Lovers. He often played the role of a friendly and vigorous young man. He made an appearance, in 1968, in the last episode of The Andy Griffith Show. The episode, Mayberry R.F.D., served as the transition episode of the then new TV series of the same name. In 1964, he played in the French movie The Troops of St. Tropez. In 1971, he played the seducing Don César in the French movie Delusions of Grandeur. The French press would refer to him as the "Italian Alain Delon". By the end of the 1960s, he used his playboy looks to shift his acting career towards erotic movies, and featured in many of the Emmanuelle movie series.

He was married to the Brazilian actress Norma Bengell from 1963 to 1969, and to the erotic actress Laura Gemser from 1976 until his death in 1991, aged 59.

Tinti died in Rome in 1991.

Selected filmography

 Amor non ho... però... però (1951) - Un componente dell'orchestra
 Falsehood (1952) - Il giovane corteggiatore di Luisa (uncredited)
 In Olden Days (1952) - Il giovanotto sul treno (segment "Meno di un giorno") (uncredited)
 Easy Years (1953) - Piero Loffredo
 Chronicle of Poor Lovers (1954) - Mario Parigi
 Days of Love (1954) - Gino
 Chiens perdus sans collier (1955) - Marcel, le surveillant
 Il coraggio (1955) - Raffaele Vaccarellio
 Scapricciatiello (1955) - The Baron Renato De Rosa / Scapricciatiello
 The Band of Honest Men (1956) - Michele, figlio di Bonocore
 Totò lascia o raddoppia? (1956) - Bruno Palmieri
 Time of Vacation (1956) - Luciano
 El Alamein (1957) - Sergio Marchi
 Malafemmena (1957) - Eduardo
 Sorrisi e canzoni (1958) - Renato Proietti
 Serenatella sciuè sciuè (1958) - Mario
 Non sono più Guaglione (1958) - Vincenzino
 Civitas Dei (1958)
 Lost Souls (1959) - Carlo
 Destinazione Sanremo (1959) - Tonino
 Goliath and the Barbarians (1959)
 Agosto, donne mie non vi conosco (1959) - Nardo
 David and Goliath (1960)
 Il principe fusto (1960)
 Letto a tre piazze (1960) - Nino, il fidanzato di Prassede
 Caccia al marito (1960) - Ingegnere Gabriele Bini
 Heaven on Earth (1960) - Antonio Verbano
 Esther and the King (1960) - Samual
 Madri pericolose (1960) - Carlo Bianchi
 Journey Beneath the Desert (1961) - Max
 Ulysses Against the Son of Hercules (1962) - Mercurio
 Alone Against Rome (1962) - Goruk
 La banda Casaroli (1962) - Agente Spinelli
 Sodom and Gomorrah (1962) - Lieutenant
 The Condemned of Altona (1962) - Actor
 The Seventh Sword (1962) - Corvo
 Torpedo Bay (1963)
 Weeping for a Bandit (1964) - Comandante
 Noite Vazia (1964) - Nelson
 The Troops of St. Tropez (1964) - Gangster chauffeur
 Le tardone (1964) - Giorgio (episode "Canto flamenco")
 Seven Golden Men (1965) - Aldo (l'italien)
 Playa de Formentor (1965) - Miguel
 The Flight of the Phoenix (1965) - Gabriele
 Seven Golden Men Strike Again (1966) - Aldo
 Trap for the Assassin (1966) - Raymond de Noirville
 L'homme de Mykonos (1966) - Silvio Donati
 Brigade antigangs (1966) - Jobic Le Goff
 The Oldest Profession (1967) - L'uomo del mar (segment "Ère préhistorique, L'")
 Son of Django (1967) - Jeff Tracy
 The Wild Eye (1967) - Valentino
 The Legend of Lylah Clare (1968) - Paolo
 The Libertine (1968) - Man in Car
 Ecce Homo (1968) - Len
 The Tough and the Mighty (1969) - Nanni Ripari
 Check to the Queen (1969) - Franco
 Rider on the Rain (1970) - Tony Mau
 La morte risale a ieri sera (1970) - Mascaranti
 Qui ? (1970) - Claude
 Cannon for Cordoba (1970) - Antonio
 The Seven Headed Lion (1970) - American Agent
 Sapho ou La fureur d'aimer (1971) - Aldo
 Il sorriso del ragno (1971)
 The Contract (1971) - Flaggert
 Delusions of Grandeur (1971) - Don Cesar
 Al tropico del cancro (1972) - Fred Wright
 The Countess Died of Laughter (1973) - Vincent van der Straaten
 La isla misteriosa y el capitán Nemo (1973) - Ayrton
 Le complot (1973) - Moret
 Profession: Aventuriers (1973)
 Lisa and the Devil (1973) - George
 24 ore... non un minuto di più (1973)
 I figli di nessuno (1974) - Guido Canali
 And Now My Love (1974) - Six-Day Husband
 Seduzione coniugale (1974)
 The Eerie Midnight Horror Show (1974) - Luisa's Lover
 Impossible Is Not French (1974) - Count Jean-Charles de Bonfort
 La sensualità è un attimo di vita (1975) - Antonio
 Children of Rage (1975) - Dr. Russanak
 Black Emanuelle (1975) - Richard Clifton
 Sins Without Intentions (1975) - Maurizio
 Diabolicamente... Letizia (1975) - Marcello Martinozzi
 Il letto in piazza (1976) - Luca's Friend
  (1976) - The Boss
 La ragazza dalla pelle di corallo (1976) - Fabrizio
 Emanuelle in Bangkok (1976) - Roberto
 Il colpaccio (1976) - Michael
 Black Cobra Woman (1976) - Jules Carmichael
 Black Emmanuelle, White Emmanuelle (1976) - Carlo
 Emanuelle in America (1977) - Alfredo Elvize, Duke of Mount Elba
 Suor Emanuelle (1977) - Rene
 Gangbuster (1977) - Tony
 Emanuelle and the Last Cannibals (1977) - Professor Mark Lester
 Emanuelle and the White Slave Trade (1978) - Francis Harley
 La mujer de la tierra caliente (1978) - Don Giuliano
 Voglia di donna (1978) - Bruno
 ...And Give Us Our Daily Sex (1979) - Professor (uncredited)
 Don't Trust the Mafia (1979) - Tony Lo Bianco
 Emanuelle's Daughter (1980) - Tommy / Victor's friend
 International Prostitution: Brigade criminelle (1980) - Tony Marcone
 Porno Esotic Love (1980) - Steve
 Die Todesgöttin des Liebescamps (1981) - Gabriel
 Nessuno è perfetto (1981) - Nanni
 Caligula... The Untold Story (1982) - Marcellus Agrippa
 Violence in a Women's Prison (1982) - Doctor Moran
 Messo comunale praticamente spione (1982) - Gastone
 La belva dalla calda pelle (1982) - Bony
 Emanuelle Escapes from Hell (1983) - Crazy Boy Henderson
 Endgame (1983) - Bull
 Dagger Eyes (1983) - Mink
 Il peccato di Lola (1984) - Angus
 The Secret of Seagull Island (1985) - Enzo Lombardi
 The Pleasure (1985) - Gerard Villeneuve
 Cut and Run (1985) - Manuel
 Passaporto segnalato (1985)
 Senza vergogna (1986) - Massimo
 Il mostro di Firenze (1986) - Enrico
 Convent of Sinners (1986) - Monsignore
 Giuro che ti amo (1986)
 Beaks: The Movie (1987) - Rod
 Riflessi di luce (1988) - Federico / composer
 Non aver paura della zia Marta (1988) - Richard Hamilton
 La stanza delle parole (1989) - Michele (uncredited)
 La puritana (1989) - Alfieri
 The Children Thief (1991) - L'argentin 1
 The Crawlers (1993) - Dr. Pritzi (uncredited) (final film role)

References

External links

1932 births
1991 deaths
Italian male actors
20th-century Italian male actors
People from Molinella